Deb Matejicka (born in Winnipeg, Manitoba) is a Canadian sports journalist formerly working for The Score sports television network.

Matejicka received a degree in political studies and English from the University of Manitoba and a diploma in creative communications with a major in journalism from Red River College.

After launching her journalism career in Brandon, Manitoba, she worked for the CTV network in Saskatoon and Regina, Saskatchewan, A-Channel in Calgary, and CKVU in Vancouver. Matejicka began working for The Score in October 2001. In 2013, Matejicka joined The Weather Network as its Calgary bureau reporter.

In May 2018, Matejicka joined Global Calgary as its community events reporter.

Matejicka is a former competitive swimmer. She has three children.

References

External links
 Deb Matejicka Twitter
 The Weather Network Talent - Deb Matejicka

Canadian television sportscasters
People from Winnipeg
Women sports announcers
Living people
Year of birth missing (living people)
Canadian women television journalists